Andrews Middle School may refer to:

Andrews Independent School District
Cherokee County Schools (North Carolina)